Bill Bradshaw (birth unknown – 2017) was a professional rugby league footballer who played in the 1940s and 1950s.

Club career

Challenge Cup Final appearances
Bill Bradshaw played  in Featherstone Rovers' 12-18 defeat by Workington Town in the 1951–52 Challenge Cup Final during the 1951–52 season at Wembley Stadium, London on Saturday 19 April 1952, in front of a crowd of 72,093.

Club career
Bill Bradshaw made his début for Featherstone Rovers on Saturday 18 December 1943, and he played his last match for Featherstone Rovers during 1956–57 season.

References

External links
Search for "Bradshaw" at rugbyleagueproject.org
Search for "William Bradshaw" at britishnewspaperarchive.co.uk
Search for "Bill Bradshaw" at britishnewspaperarchive.co.uk
Search for "Billy Bradshaw" at britishnewspaperarchive.co.uk

2017 deaths
English rugby league players
Featherstone Rovers players
Place of birth missing
Place of death missing
Rugby league hookers
Year of birth missing